A scabellum, Latin word from ancient Greek krupalon or krupezon, is a percussion instrument, a kind of Clapper used in ancient Rome and Greece.
It is worn like a sandal by the right foot, used in antiquity by the conductor or by the aulos player to mark the rhythm. A scabellum is composed of two wooden or metallic plates, forming two thick soles connected by a hinge at the back. Two small cymbals were often fixed; it may be considered as an ancestor of the Hi-hat.

References

See also 

Plaque concussion idiophones
Foot percussion
Unpitched percussion instruments